Cold Hell is a 2017 German–Austrian thriller film directed by Stefan Ruzowitzky.

Cast 
 Violetta Schurawlow - Özge Dogruol
 Tobias Moretti - Christian Steiner
 Robert Palfrader - Samir
 Sammy Sheik - Saeed el Hadary
 Friedrich von Thun - Karl Steiner
  - Ilhan
 Verena Altenberger - Ranya
 Steffen Anton - Soeren Eckdal
 Stephani Burkhard - Nazan
  - Adem
 Hans-Maria Darnov - Teacher
  - Frau Öfferl

References

External links 

2010s German films
2010s German-language films
2017 thriller films
Austrian thriller drama films
Films directed by Stefan Ruzowitzky
German thriller drama films